Arvid Kramer (born October 3, 1956) is a retired American professional basketball player, mostly known for being the first overall pick by the Miami Heat of the National Basketball Association (NBA) in the 1988 expansion draft at the age of 31, and furthermore being the only player to be selected in two expansion drafts and never playing for the teams that drafted him. 

Professional career

Anchorage Northern Knights (1979-1980) 
Kramer was drafted by the Utah Jazz in the 3rd round (1st pick, 45th overall) of the 1979 NBA draft in his senior year. After the draft, the Jazz made a 2-for-1 trade involving Bernard King, which left no room for Kramer on their roster, so they waived him. He played for the Anchorage Northern Knights of the Continental Basketball Association during the 1979–80 season.

Denver Nuggets (1980) 
Kramer was signed to a 10-day contract by the Denver Nuggets on February 28, 1980, and was later signed for the remainder of the season. He only played eight games with the Nuggets during the 1979–80 season.

Telekom Baskets Bonn (1995-1996) 
The expansion Miami Heat of the NBA made Kramer the first overall pick in the 1988 expansion draft at the age of 31. The Dallas Mavericks wanted to make sure that their players Uwe Blab, Steve Alford or Bill Wennington, who were left unprotected, would not be selected, so they offered the Miami Heat the rights to Arvid Kramer and their first choice (No. 20) in the college draft (which later would turn out to become Kevin Edwards). He never played for the Heat.

Kramer later played for Telekom Baskets Bonn during the 1995–96 season. He retired as a player in 1996 and worked as a general manager for the Baskets in Bonn, Germany from 1996 to 2004.

References

1956 births
Living people
American expatriate basketball people in France
American expatriate basketball people in Germany
American expatriate basketball people in Italy
American men's basketball players
Anchorage Northern Knights players
Augustana (South Dakota) Vikings men's basketball players
Basketball players from Minnesota
Bayer Giants Leverkusen players
Centers (basketball)
Dallas Mavericks expansion draft picks
Denver Nuggets players
Mens Sana Basket players
Miami Heat expansion draft picks
People from Fulda, Minnesota
Telekom Baskets Bonn players
Utah Jazz draft picks